Saraykent is a town and district of Yozgat Province in the Central Anatolia region of Turkey. The former name of the town is Karamağara. According to 2000 census, population of the district is 26,077 of which 9,224 live in the town of Saraykent.

Notes

References

External links
 District governor's official website 
 District municipality's official website 
 General information on Saraykent 

Populated places in Yozgat Province
Districts of Yozgat Province